This is a list of notable members of Kappa Alpha Theta, a North American college Fraternity. This list includes both initiated and honorary members.

Academics

Elva Bascom (Mu, Allegheny) - librarian, professor, writer on library science
Mary Ritter Beard (Alpha, DePauw) – noted historian, Campaigner for Women's Suffrage.
Molly Corbett Broad (Chi, Syracuse) – Served as president of the University of North Carolina, 1997–2006.
Matilda Moldenhauer Brooks (Alpha Omega, Pittsburgh) – research scientist who discovered methylene blue.
Gertrude Simmons Burlingham (Chi, Syracuse) – mycologist, first woman to earn a Ph.D. from Columbia University through the program at the New York Botanical Garden in 1908.
Anna Botsford Comstock (Iota, Cornell) – 1st woman appointed to the faculty at Cornell.
Mary Lee Edward (Sigma, Toronto) – women's health pioneer and First World War hero.
Dian Fossey (Gamma Xi, San Jose State) – zoologist, first female Primatologist, wrote Gorillas in the Mist.
Eilene Galloway (Alpha Iota, Washington University in St. Louis) – researcher and editor.
Edith Jordan Gardner (Phi Deuteron, Stanford) – educator and suffrage activist
Elizabeth Gilmore Holt (Psi, Wisconsin) – art historian.
Karen Ordahl Kupperman (Alpha Mu, Missouri) – American historian.
Maud Menten (Sigma, Toronto) – physician, scientist.
Margaret Floy Washburn (Iota, Cornell) – the 1st woman to receive a Ph.D. in Psychology.

Arts and entertainment

Ann-Margret (Tau, Northwestern) – actress, (State Fair, Viva Las Vegas, Grumpy Old Men).
Sasha Alexander (Omicron, USC) – actress (NCIS, Rizzoli & Isles)
Valerie Bettis – (Alpha Theta, Texas-Austin) dancer/choreographer
Susan Browning (Beta Phi, Penn State) – Tony Award-winning actress.
Sarah Clarke (Beta, Indiana) – actress, (24).
Nancy Coleman (Alpha Lambda, Washington) – actress.
Jane Connell (Omega, UC Berkeley) – actress.
Joan Ganz Cooney (Beta Delta, Arizona) – founder of the Children's Television Workshop and creator of Sesame Street.
DaNae Couch (Epsilon Epsilon, Baylor) – Miss Texas 2012
Sheryl Crow (Alpha Mu, Missouri) – Grammy Award winning singer.
Agnes de Mille (Beta Xi, UCLA) – Broadway choreographer.
Marietta DePrima (Tau, Northwestern) – actress. 
Marion Dougherty (Beta Phi, Penn State) – casting director.
Patricia DuBose Duncan (Alpha Iota, Washington University in St. Louis) – artist.
Cindy Chupack (Tau, Northwestern) – Golden Globe & Emmy Award-winning screenwriter and producer.
Cinta Laura – (Epsilon Upsilon, Columbia) Indonesian movie and pop star
Ronnie Claire Edwards (Alpha Omicron, Oklahoma) – actress.
Glenna Goodacre (Beta Omega, Colorado College) – Sculptor of the Vietnam Women's Memorial, designer of U.S. gold one-dollar coin featuring Sacagawea.
Amy Grant (Alpha Eta, Vanderbilt) – singer, Grammy Award winner.
Dorothy Hart (Beta Tau, Denison) – actress.
Jennifer Jones (Tau, Northwestern) – Academy Award-winning American actress.
Laura Lamson (Gamma deuteron, Ohio Wesleyan) – screenwriter.
Stephanie March (Tau, Northwestern) – actress, (Law & Order: Special Victims Unit).
Jacqui Malouf (Gamma Epsilon, Western Ontario) – television host, cook, author.
Rue McClanahan (Gamma Tau, Tulsa) – actress, (The Golden Girls).
Amy McKenzie (Beta Xi, UC Los Angeles) – producer, director, actress.
Karen Moncrieff (Tau, Northwestern) – actress, director, screenwriter.
Dora Mavor Moore (Sigma, Toronto) – actress, director.
Julie Moran (Gamma Delta, UGA) – former host of Entertainment Tonight; first female host of ABC'sWide World of Sports; current host of Insiders List on the Fine Living channel.
Carol Morris (Beta Kappa, Drake University) - Miss USA (1956), Miss Universe (1956).
Mary Kay Place (Gamma Tau, Tulsa) – actress, (Being John Malkovich, The Rainmaker).
Skyler Samuels – (Phi Deuteron, Stanford) Actress (Nine Lives of Chloe King, Scream Queens)
Sara Schaefer (Beta Lambda, The College of William & Mary) – Comedian and host of MTV's "Nikki & Sara Live".
Marlo Thomas (Omicron, USC) – actress and spokeswoman for St. Jude's Children's Hospital.
Kate Voegele (Gamma Upsilon, Miami (Ohio)) – singer/songwriter and One Tree Hill actress.
Jenna von Oÿ (Omicron, USC) – actress, (Blossom).
Maurine Dallas Watkins (Gamma, Butler) – playwright, (Chicago(1926)).
Teal Wicks (Epsilon Sigma, UC Irvine) – singer/actress, best known for playing Elphaba in the musical Wicked
Ashley Zais (Zeta Eta, Wofford College, SC) – Miss South Carolina USA 2007.

Business

Tory Burch (Beta Eta, University of Pennsylvania) – fashion designer.
Carolyn S. Chambers (Alpha Xi, Oregon) – owner and CEO of Chambers Communications Corporation
Tracy Britt Cool (Zeta Xi) – business executive at Berkshire Hathaway.
Melinda Gates (Beta Rho, Duke) – former wife of Bill Gates; Co-founder of Bill & Melinda Gates Foundation.
Elizabeth Holmes (Phi Deuteron, Stanford) – founder and former CEO of now-defunct Theranos, convicted of criminal fraud.
Marjorie Child Husted (Upsilon, Minnesota) – creator of Betty Crocker.
Dylan Lauren (Beta Rho, Duke) – owner of Dylan's Candy Bar and daughter of fashion designer Ralph Lauren.
Mary Wells Lawrence (Gamma Theta, Carnegie Mellon) – advertisement executive, founding president of Wells Rich Greene, first female CEO of a company listed on the New York Stock Exchange.
Kira Plastinina (Beta Sigma, Southern Methodist) – fashion designer.
Hope Skillman Schary (Alpha Delta, Goucher) – textile designer, founder and chief executive of Skillmill

Politics

Karen Koning AbuZayd (Alpha, DePauw) – Commissioner-General of the United Nations Relief and Works Agency from 2005 to 2010
Eva Bertrand Adams (Beta Mu, Nevada) – Director of the United States Mint from 1961–1969.
Jean Spencer Ashbrook (Alpha Gamma, Ohio State) – United States House Representative from Ohio
Frances Cleveland Axtell (Alpha, DePauw) – one of the first female State Representatives of Washington
Nancy Kassebaum Baker (Kappa, Kansas) – former United States Senator and the first woman elected to the United States Senate who had not succeeded her husband or first been appointed to fill an unexpired term.
Barbara Bodine (Gamma Rho, UC Santa Barbara) – United States Ambassador to Yemen
Barbara Pierce Bush (Epsilon Tau, Yale University) – daughter of President George W. Bush, Co-founder and president of the Global Health Corp.
Laura Bush (Beta Sigma, Southern Methodist) – First Lady of the United States; wife of President George W. Bush.
Pearl Chase (Omega, UC Berkeley) – civic leader.
Lynne Cheney (Beta Omega, Colorado College) – Chair, National Endowment for the Humanities; Senior Fellow, American Enterprise Institute; Director, Reader's Digest; former co-host CNN's Crossfire; Second Lady of the United States; wife of Vice President Dick Cheney.
Barbara Brandriff Crabb (Psi, Wisconsin) – Senior United States District Judge.
Anna Elizabeth Dickinson (Alpha, DePauw) – influential abolitionist and suffragist.
Joyce Fairbairn (Beta Chi, Alberta) – Canadian senator.
Mary Fallin (Beta Zeta, Oklahoma State) – 1st woman to be elected Lieutenant Governor of Oklahoma; 1st woman to be elected Governor of Oklahoma; U.S. House of Representatives.
Tillie K. Fowler (Delta Zeta, Emory) – United States Representative from Florida.
Barbara Hackman Franklin (Beta Phi, Penn State) – 29th U.S. Secretary of Commerce; CEO of Barbara Franklin Enterprises.
Jenna Bush Hager (Alpha Theta, University of Texas) – daughter of President George W. Bush.
Margaret Hance (Beta Delta, Arizona) – first female mayor of Phoenix, Arizona.
Nancy Hanks (Beta Rho, Duke) – 1st woman to serve as the Chairman of the United States National Endowment for the Arts.
Victoria Reggie Kennedy (Alpha Phi, Tulane) – wife of the late Senator Ted Kennedy
Susan King (Alpha Theta, University of Texas) – Republican member of the Texas House of Representatives from Abilene, Texas
Cindy Hensley McCain (Omicron, USC) – wife of 2008 presidential candidate Senator John McCain.
Claire McCaskill (Alpha Mu, Missouri) – U.S. Congress as Senator from Missouri.
Adelaide Sinclair (Sigma, Toronto) – Canadian public servant.
Shanta Vasisht – Indian parliamentarian
Elizabeth Warren (Gamma Kappa, George Washington University) – United States Senator from Massachusetts.

Sports

Lucille Ash (Beta Omega, Colorado) – Olympic figure skater.
Pauline Betz (Gamma Gamma, Rollins) – American female tennis player.
Louise Brough (Omicron, Southern California) – American female tennis player.
Madonna Buder (Alpha Iota, Washington University in St. Louis) – Catholic religious sister, Senior Olympian and triathlete record holder
JoAnne Carner (Delta Epsilon, Arizona State) – American professional golfer.
Ann Curtis (Omega, UC Berkeley) – Olympic gold medalist, swimming (1948).
Sasha DiGiulian (Epsilon Upsilon, Columbia) – World Champion rock climber.
Kathy Ellis (Beta, Indiana) – Olympic swimmer.
Jane Fauntz (Delta, Illinois) – Olympic Bronze Medalist swimmer & diver.
Aria Fischer (Phi Deuteron, Stanford) - Olympic Gold Medalist water polo player
Makenzie Fischer (Phi Deuteron, Stanford) - Olympic Gold Medalist water polo player
Linda Gustavson (Beta Pi, Michigan State) – Olympic swimmer and world record holder.
Shirley Fry Irvin (Gamma Gamma, Rollins) – tennis player.
Helen Jacobs (Omega, UC Berkeley) – American female tennis player.
Pamela Kruse (Beta Pi, Michigan State) – Olympic silver-medalist swimmer.
Barbara McIntire (Gamma Gamma, Rollins) – golfer.
Christen Press (Phi Deuteron, Stanford) - 2015 Women's World cup Champion for the United States.
Kerri Strug (Beta Xi, UCLA) – Olympic gymnast.
Chierika Ukogu (Phi Deuteron, Stanford) – Olympic rower for Nigeria.

Media

Carolina Bermudez (Delta Epsilon, Arizona State) – radio personality on WHTZ Z100 (New York), the biggest Top 40 station in the world.
Ally Blake (Theta Theta, North Carolina State University) – broadcast meteorologist at WKYT in Lexington, KY.
Deb Carson (Epsilon Epsilon, Baylor) – national sports anchor & on-air personality, Fox Sports Radio.
Kelly Corrigan (Epsilon Psi, Richmond) – author.
Harriet Doerr (Phi Deuteron, Stanford) – writer.
Isabelle Holland (Alpha Phi, Tulane) – author.
Amy Holmes (Epsilon Mu, Princeton) – journalist, news anchor.
Suzanne La Follette (Alpha Sigma, Washington State) – author, journalist, and libertarian feminist advocate.
Kate Lehrer (Gamma Psi, Texas Christian) – novelist, book reviewer, writer.
Jean Marzollo (Gamma Zeta, Connecticut) – children's author and illustrator
Mary Margaret McBride (Alpha Mu, Missouri) – widely followed radio commentator, journalist, author (1935–1955).
Alexi McCammond (Epsilon Phi, Chicago) - Political Reporter, Axios.
Kate Millett (Upsilon, Minnesota) – American feminist and author.
Judith Miller (Alpha Gamma, Ohio State) – American journalist.
Anne Marie Pace (Beta Lambda, William and Mary) – children's book author, author of the Vampirina Ballerina series.
Marjorie Kinnan Rawlings (Psi, Wisconsin) – author, (The Yearling).
Kate Snow (Iota, Cornell) – anchor for Good Morning America.
Melissa Stark (Delta Chi, Virginia) – news reporter, Monday Night Football.
Ida Tarbell (Mu, Allegheny College) – American journalist.

Miscellaneous

Jennifer Bertrand (Kappa, University of Kansas) – winner of HGTV Design Star season three.
Neilia Hunter Biden (Chi, Syracuse) - teacher, first wife of Joe Biden
Katie Lee Joel (Gamma Upsilon, Miami University Ohio) – chef, restaurant critic, former wife of Billy Joel.
Dorothy Liebes (Omega, UC Berkeley) – "mother of modern weaving".
Marion Manley (Delta, Illinois) – received the Gold Medal Award in 1973 from the Florida Association of the American Institute of Architects.
Julia Morgan (Omega, UC Berkeley) – designed the Hearst Castle, first woman to receive the AIA Gold Medal.
Carol Morris (Beta Kappa, Drake) –  the second Miss USA to win the Miss Universe title in the pageant's fifth edition in 1956.
 Shelby Ringdahl (Gamma Psi, TCU) – 2013 Miss Missouri winner and 2014 Miss America semifinalist.
Tiffany Trump (Beta Eta, University of Pennsylvania) – socialite, law school graduate, daughter of Donald Trump.

References

Lists of members of United States student societies
sisters